"Beautiful in My Eyes" is a song by American singer-songwriter Joshua Kadison. It was released in 1994 as the second single from his 1993 debut album Painted Desert Serenade, surpassing the performance of his debut single and breakout hit "Jessie", reaching No. 19 on the US Billboard Hot 100, and charting in four other countries including the UK, where it peaked at No. 65. A re-release the following year in the UK proved more successful, reaching the top 40 and peaking at No. 37 on the UK Singles Chart.

Background
Kadison described the song as being about "a love that just lasts forever, and you'll always be beautiful in my eyes." Years after its release, the song was often mistaken as an Elton John song, due to Kadison's baritone voice being similar to John's and in how he plays the piano on it.

Critical reception
Larry Flick from Billboard wrote, "Kadison follows the slow-growing "Jessie" with another easy-going, piano-driven pop ballad wrapped with sugary, romantic prose and gospel-spiked background vocals. Kadison's earnest, wide-eyed performance keeps things from flying too far over the top. Song will test his base at top 40 radio, although it is an easy bet for immediate AC action." Fell and Rufer from the Gavin Report remarked that it was released on the one-year anniversary of the release of his first single, complimenting it as a "fabulous production
that builds to a string-laden climax." A reviewer from Music Week gave it three out of five, commenting, "Another obvious smash from this softcore Billy Joel. Despite the comparative UK failure of "Jessie", one of these songs is going to take off here, but which one?"

Charts

References

1993 songs
1994 singles
Joshua Kadison songs
Song recordings produced by Rod Argent
Pop ballads